MilkBoy is an American recording studio and entertainment company founded in 1994 by Tommy Joyner. Company headquarters is located at MilkBoy the Studio, at 413 North 7th Street in Philadelphia, Pennsylvania. The original "MilkBoy Recording" was located in north Philadelphia at 5th and Olney above Zapf's music. In 2002 after partnering with composer Jamie Lokoff in 1999  Joyner moved to the Philadelphia "main line" area and opened the second studio at 44 West Lancaster Avenue in Ardmore, Pennsylvania. In 2006, MilkBoy opened its first food and beverage operation, a coffee shop and acoustic music venue on Cricket Avenue in Ardmore, right around the corner from the recording studio. A few years later they opened another MilkBoy Coffee in Bryn Mawr, Pennsylvania, which changed ownership in 2012.

In late 2011, MilkBoy Coffee obtained a liquor license and changed locations to Center City, Philadelphia. The newly named "MilkBoy" ("Coffee" was dropped from the business) a bar, restaurant, and live music venue, opened at 1100 Chestnut Street in Center City Philadelphia. Shortly after, in  January 2012, Joyner and Lokoff left the Ardmore studio, bought what had previously been "The Studio," at 413 North 7th, and rebranded as MilkBoy the Studio, taking over operations from the previous owner producer/arranger Larry Gold. In his 2013 profile for Philadelphia Weekly, Kyle Cassidy touts the enterprising MilkBoy group as a Philly institution in entertainment and hospitality, writing "what’s most defined their success, especially over the last year, is their willingness to diversify and seek business outside of the obvious realm of straightforward music production."

In 2010, partners Lokoff and Joyner formed the production company BBCG Films, LLC with co-producers Tammy Tiehel-Stedman and Brian O'Connor to produce the movie "Slow Learners," a romantic comedy starring Adam Pally and Sarah Burns. The movie was released by IFC Films' Sundance Selects on August 19th, 2015.

In 2017, the MilkBoy brand expanded to College Park, Maryland opening MilkBoy ArtHouse in partnership with the University of Maryland, College Park. MilkBoy decided to end their partnership with UMD at the end of 2019.

MilkBoy hosts three open mic competitions each year. The event kicks off at their south street location on Monday nights where ten finalists are chosen to move on to a live
Competition at the Chestnut St. Location. The winner of this final event receives a recording contract at the studio on callowhill.

Notable Artists
Notable artists who have had projects produced at MilkBoy Recording in Ardmore and MilkBoy the Studio in Philadelphia 

Silk Sonic

Jazmine Sullivan
Meek Mill
Ariana Grande
Miley Cyrus
Florence + the Machine
 Dave Matthews
Trey Songz
James Taylor
Gomez 
Ashanti
Solace in the Shadows
Scot Sax
The Dixie Hummingbirds
Marsha Ambrosius
Centripetal Force
Lil Uzi Vert
StreetCorp
Rosa Nice

Daniel Distell

References 

Recording studios in the United States
1994 establishments in Pennsylvania
Center City, Philadelphia
College Park, Maryland

http://www.milkboythestudio.com/

https://billypenn.com/2019/12/30/they-recorded-miley-kanye-nicki-minaj-phillys-hottest-studio-is-expanding-to-maryland/

https://www.uwishunu.com/2012/03/tommy-joyner-co-founder-of-milkboy-recording/